Yohan Manuel Ramírez (born May 6, 1995) is a Dominican professional baseball pitcher for the Pittsburgh Pirates of Major League Baseball (MLB). He has previously played in MLB for the Seattle Mariners and Cleveland Guardians.

Career

Houston Astros
Ramírez signed with the Houston Astros as an international free agent on June 15, 2016 for a $15,000 signing bonus. He split the 2016 season between the DSL Astros and the GCL Astros, going a combined 2–1 with a 2.37 ERA over  innings. He split the 2017 season between the Quad Cities River Bandits, Buies Creek Astros, and Corpus Christi Hooks, going a combined 4–5 with a 4.66 ERA over  innings. 

He split the 2018 season between Quad Cities and Buies Creek, going a combined 6–8 with a 3.00 ERA over 78 innings. He split the 2019 season between the Fayetteville Woodpeckers and Corpus Christi, going a combined 4–7 with a 3.99 ERA over 106 innings.

Seattle Mariners
On December 12, 2019, Ramírez was selected by the Seattle Mariners in the 2019 Rule 5 draft. Ramírez made his major league debut on July 24, 2020 against the Houston Astros, pitching one scoreless inning. He finished the season with a 2.61 ERA along with 26 strikeouts and 20 walks in  innings. In 2021, Ramírez made 25 appearances for Seattle, posting a 1-3 record and 3.90 ERA with 35 strikeouts in 27.2 innings pitched.

In 2022 with Seattle, Ramírez made 7 appearances, struggling to a 7.56 ERA with 10 strikeouts in 8.1 innings pitched. On May 13, he was designated for assignment by the Mariners.

Cleveland Guardians
Ramírez was traded to the Cleveland Guardians on May 16, 2022 in exchange for cash considerations or a player to be named later.

The Guardians designated Ramírez for assignment on July 3, 2022.

Pittsburgh Pirates
Ramírez was traded to the Pittsburgh Pirates on July 8, 2022 in exchange for cash considerations.

References

External links

1995 births
Living people
Major League Baseball players from the Dominican Republic
Major League Baseball pitchers
Seattle Mariners players
Cleveland Guardians players
Pittsburgh Pirates players
Dominican Summer League Astros players
Gulf Coast Astros players
Quad Cities River Bandits players
Buies Creek Astros players
Corpus Christi Hooks players
Águilas Cibaeñas players
Fayetteville Woodpeckers players
Tacoma Rainiers players